Jussi Tupamäki (born 30 November 1977) is a Finnish ice hockey coach.

He was born in Pori.

Since 2017, he is the head coach of Estonia men's national ice hockey team.

References

Living people
1977 births
Finnish ice hockey coaches
Estonia men's national ice hockey team coaches
Sportspeople from Pori
21st-century Finnish people